The River and Coastal Police – RCP (Vietnamese: Cảnh Sát Sông Và Ven Biển – CSSVVB), also variously designated as Marine Police and 'Police Nautique' or 'Police Fluviale et Côtière' in French, was the "naval" branch of the Republic of Vietnam National Police (Vietnamese: Cãnh Sát Quốc Gia – CSQG), active from 1965 to 1975.

History
The Marine Police was officially established in 1965 by the south Vietnamese government to provide a waterborne law-enforcement capability to assist the CSQG in countering Viet Cong (VC) activity on the more than 3,000 miles of navigable inland waterways. This effort was directed primarily at the Mekong Delta area. The Marine Police had responsibility for control and maintenance of security on navigable waterways and sea ports in the Republic of Vietnam, the support of resources control, the enforcement of civil and maritime law, and assistance in other police activities.

Structure
Headquartered at Phú Xuân, near Huế in Thừa Thiên Province, the Marine Police had an initial strength of 350 men, who operated 100 river patrol boats from three bases in the Mekong delta and patrolled 40 miles of waterways by late 1966. The Marine Police was placed in 1969 under the control of the Field Police Command (Vietnamese: Cãnh Sát Dã Chiên – CSDC) co-located to the CSQG Headquarters at Saigon. By 1970-71, it had grown to a force of 2,404 men operating from 22 riverine and coastal bases located in all of the four Military Regions, patrolling 440 miles of waterways and the sea coast in 380 river and inshore patrol craft. Boat crews were trained at the Marine Police Training Centre (Vietnamese: Trung tâm huấn luyện cảnh sát biển) co-located at their Phú Xuân HQ, which also housed the Police repair yard.

See also
 Brown Water Navy
 First Indochina War
 Republic of Vietnam
 Republic of Vietnam Military Forces
 Republic of Vietnam Navy
 Vietnam War
 Weapons of the Vietnam War

Notes

References
 Sir Robert Thompson et al., Report on the Republic of Vietnam National Police, 1971. [available online at http://www.counterinsurgency.org/1971%20Thompson%20Police/Thompson%20Police.htm]
 Valéry Tarrius, La Police de Campagne du Sud-Vietnam 1967-1975, in Armes Militaria Magazine, March 2005 issue, Histoire & Collections, Paris, pp. 37–43.  (in French)

External links
Federation of South Vietnam Police Associations (in Vietnamese)
The "White Mice" of Vietnam 
RVN National Police at globalsecurity.org
 http://camopedia.org/index.php?title=Republic_of_Vietnam
 http://www.polinsignia.com/vietnam.htm

Republic of Vietnam National Police
1975 disestablishments in Vietnam